The Angolan basketball Super Cup is a single-match competition in Angolan basketball, played between the Angolan league champion and the Angola Cup winner of the previous season. In case the same team happens to win both the league and the cup, the match will be played between the league winner and the cup runner-up.

The Super Cup match marks the beginning of the basketball season, followed by the league and the cup.

Clube Desportivo Primeiro de Agosto has been the most successful club in this competition with a total 12 titles won, whereas in the women's competition, Interclube and Clube Desportivo Primeiro de Agosto share the lead with a total 8 titles won each.

Angola Basketball Super Cup Finals (Men)

Angola Basketball Super Cup Winners (Men)

Angola Basketball Super Cup Finals (Women)

Angola Basketball Super Cup Winners (Women)

See also
 Taça de Angola
 Federação Angolana de Basquetebol
 Supertaça de Angola (football)
 Supertaça de Angola (handball)
 Supertaça de Angola (roller hockey)

References

 
Basketball cup competitions in Angola